Puven Pather is an Australian film director, screenwriter, actor and stunt performer born in South Africa.

Puven has been married to actress Jessica Gower since 2004, and the couple have a daughter named Sequoia.

Career
Pather came to Australia at the age of nine from Durban, South Africa. He began his film career at the age of 16, as a stunt performer in Melbourne. He has been a professional stunt performer and stunt coordinator since 1990. As a stunt performer, he has performed such stunts as high falls, water work (scuba), air rams, rock climbing, rigging, ski/snowboarding, full body torches, driving, fights, car hits, crash bangs and more. His credits include Superman, Ghost Rider and Charlotte's Web.

He has been an actor in films since 1995, often performing his own stunts.

He is a directing graduate of the Australian Film, Television and Radio School (AFTRS), where he gained recognition and won awards for his work as a Director.  His directorial debut was with the films The Shot and The Visitor.  As part of the Slamdance Film Festival, The Shot had its US premiere at American Cinematheque on 20 August 2003, at the Egyptian Theater. It was shown at the Tampere International Short Film Festival, Finland, 5–9 March 2003, the 29th Seoul Independent Film Festival, and the AFTRS National screening tour.

However, Pather is most known for Neighbours episode 7591, where he places a stunt double.

Awards
He won "Best New Director" for The Shot, at the 20th annual St Kilda Film Festival in Melbourne, where he also won both "Best Fiction" and "Best Achievement with An Original Screenplay" for his work The Visitor.

The Shot then won "Best Film" at the "Spanischer Kurzfilm Sieger bei Festival" (Spanish Film festival) in Berlin. and "First Prize" at the 2003 Australian Shorts Film Festival.

Reviews
Current offered of The Shot:This is a very good, tightly shot, short film that anyone into vanguard photojournalism should watch. Cinematography and direction are well executed and the story is succinctly sharp.

Director

Actor

Stunt

References

External links
 
 "Puven Pather filmography", The New York Times
 Puven Pather CV
 "The Shot" a short film by Puven Pather 
 "Waterbabies", 07:23, 14 Oct 2006 Australian Film Television and Radio School 

Australian film directors
Australian stunt performers
Male actors from Melbourne
Actors from Durban
South African emigrants to Australia
Year of birth missing (living people)
Living people